Let Not Man Put Asunder is a 1924 American silent drama film starring Pauline Frederick, produced and directed by J. Stuart Blackton, and distributed by Vitagraph, a company Blackton co-founded. The story is based on a 1902 novel of the same name by Basil King about divorce.

Similarly, Let No Man Put Asunder, titled film was made in 1913 by the Essanay Company starring Francis X. Bushman  and Beverly Bayne.

Cast

Costars Tellegen and Frazin both committed unrelated suicides after their respective serial divorces and career declines.

Preservation
With no prints of Let Not Man Put Asunder found in any film archive, it is a lost film.

References

External links 

Stills at the Pauline Frederick website

1924 films
1924 drama films
Silent American drama films
American silent feature films
American black-and-white films
Films based on Canadian novels
Films directed by J. Stuart Blackton
Lost American films
Vitagraph Studios films
1924 lost films
Lost drama films
1920s American films